Umayalpuram K. Narayanaswamy (1929–1997, India), was a Carnatic classical percussionist. 
A recipient of the Sangeet Natak Akademi and Kalaimamani awards, Narayanaswamy accompanied renowned musicians like M. S. Subbulakshmi, S. Rajam and Guruvayur Dorai. He established his mark playing the ghatam with such dexterity and beauty in phrasing.

References

1929 births
Ghatam players
Indian percussionists
1997 deaths
20th-century Indian musicians
Recipients of the Sangeet Natak Akademi Award